Lothar Friedrich (11 December 1930 – 19 April 2015) was a German professional racing cyclist. He rode in four editions of the Tour de France.

References

External links
 

1930 births
2015 deaths
German male cyclists
People from Völklingen
Cyclists from Saarland